M142 is the HIMARS light multiple rocket launcher.

M142 may also refer to:

 M-142 (Michigan highway)
 M142 firing device, commonly used in Booby traps